The 1948–49 BAA season was the third and final season of the Basketball Association of America. The 1949 BAA Playoffs ended with the Minneapolis Lakers winning the BAA Championship, beating the Washington Capitols 6 games in the BAA Finals.

The NBA recognizes the three BAA seasons as part of its own history so the 1948–49 BAA season is considered the third NBA season. Following the season, the BAA and National Basketball League merged to create the National Basketball Association or NBA.

Notable occurrences 

Four National Basketball League teams (Fort Wayne, Indianapolis, Minneapolis and Rochester) joined the BAA for the 1948–49 season.

Final standings

Eastern Division

Western Division

Playoffs

Statistics leaders 

Note: Prior to the 1969–70 season, league leaders in points and assists were determined by totals rather than averages.

BAA awards 

All-BAA First Team:
G   Max Zaslofsky, Chicago Stags
G/F Bob Davies, Rochester Royals
C   George Mikan, Minneapolis Lakers
F Jim Pollard, Minneapolis Lakers
F   Joe Fulks, Philadelphia Warriors
All-BAA Second Team
C   Arnie Risen, Rochester Royals
C   Bob Feerick, Washington Capitols
F/C Bones McKinney, Washington Capitols
G   Ken Sailors, Providence Steamrollers
G   John Logan, St. Louis Bombers

References